Witch Hunt is a 1994 HBO fantasy detective television film directed by Paul Schrader and starring Dennis Hopper and Eric Bogosian. The film, written by Joseph Dougherty, is a sequel to the 1991 film Cast a Deadly Spell, with Hopper playing private detective H. Phillip Lovecraft replacing Fred Ward.  Additionally, many characters have different backstories than in Cast a Deadly Spell. For example, Lovecraft refuses to use magic in Cast a Deadly Spell on principle, but in Witch Hunt he refuses because of a bad experience he has had. The original music score was composed by Angelo Badalamenti.

Cast
 Dennis Hopper as Harry Phillip Lovecraft (same initials as Howard Phillips Lovecraft)
 Penelope Ann Miller as Kim Hudson
 Eric Bogosian as Senator Larson Crockett
 Sheryl Lee Ralph as Hypolita Laveau Kropotkin
 Julian Sands as Finn Macha
 Valerie Mahaffey as Trudy
 John Epperson as Vivian Dart (as Lypsinka)
 Debi Mazar as The Manicurist
 Alan Rosenberg as N.J. Gotlieb
 Clifton Collins Jr. as Tyrone

Plot
The film takes place in a fictional Los Angeles where magic is real, monsters and mythical beasts stalk the back alleys, zombies are used as cheap labor, and everyone—except hardboiled private investigator H. Philip Lovecraft (Hopper)—uses magic every day. Yet, cars, telephones and other modern technology also exist in this world. The year is 1953, at the beginning of the Second Red Scare, but in this universe magic is substituted for communism and the McCarthy-esque proceedings are being run by Senator Larson Crockett (Bogosian).

Lovecraft is hired by film star Kim Hudson (Miller) to dig up dirt on her husband, producer N.J. Gotlieb (Rosenberg), who is about to replace her on his latest film with a young starlet he may be having an affair with. Gaining entry to the studio with the help of practicing witch Hypolita Kropotkin (Ralph), his friend and landlady who is working for the studio, he encounters Finn Macha (Sands), a warlock and former private investigator with whom he had once crossed paths. When Gotlieb is murdered by magic, Senator Crockett uses the crime to make Kropotkin a scapegoat for use in his Anti-Magic crusade and uses newly-passed Congressional legislation to have her sentenced to death by public burning. Lovecraft must now not only save Kropotkin and uncover the real murderer, the motive behind the murder and the secrets Kim Hudson is hiding, but also confront the demons in his own past...a past that includes Finn Macha and the reason why Lovecraft will not use magic.

References

External links
 
 

1994 television films
1994 horror films
American comedy horror films
American urban fantasy films
American satirical films
American detective films
1990s English-language films
Films set in the 1950s
American neo-noir films
American supernatural horror films
1990s supernatural horror films
American supernatural comedy films
Cthulhu Mythos films
HBO Films films
1994 films
Films based on works by H. P. Lovecraft
1990s comedy horror films
American horror television films
1994 comedy films
1990s American films